Kabiru Ado Lakwaya, popularly known as Lakwaya, is a politician who is an Executive Council of Kano State member, and is serving as a Commissioner of Youth and Sports Development.

Early life
Kabiru Ado was born in Lakwaya Ward of Gwarzo local government area of Kano State.

Political career
Lakwaya was a students leader, he was the National Senate President of the National Association of Kano State Student (NAKSS) while he was an undergraduate at Usman Danfodio University Sokoto. Before his appointment as a Commissioner, Lakwaya was the Chairman of National Youth Council of Nigeria Kano State Branch.
Lakwaya contest for Kano State House of Assembly seat in 2019 Nigerian general elections under the flat form of All Progressive Congress APC where he stepdown for the incumbent member representing Gwarzo Constituency in the Kano State House of Assembly.

Lakwaya was appointed as the Commissioner of Kano State Ministry of Youth and Sports Development by Governor Abdullahi Umar Ganduje.

See also
 Executive Council of Kano State

References 

1975 births
21st-century Nigerian politicians
Living people
Politicians from Kano
Politicians from Kano State